Marina Historic District is a national historic district in Delray Beach, Florida in Palm Beach County. Situated on the Intracoastal Waterway and including the town's City Marina, it is bounded by E. Atlantic Ave., Marine Way, SE 4th Str, SE 7th Ave.

It was added to the National Register of Historic Places in 2014.

References

National Register of Historic Places in Palm Beach County, Florida
Historic districts on the National Register of Historic Places in Florida